Joseph Owens  (April 17, 1908 – October 30, 2005) was a Canadian Roman Catholic priest and a philosopher specializing in the thought of Aristotle, Thomas Aquinas, and medieval philosophy.

Life and career

Owens received his PhD in 1951 from the Pontifical Institute of Mediaeval Studies, an affiliate of the University of Toronto, and remained at the institute as a teacher and distinguished researcher for the rest of his career.  He authored nine books and almost 150 academic papers.

He was a Fellow of the Royal Society of Canada and served as president of the Metaphysical Society of America (1972), the Canadian Philosophical Association, the Society for Ancient Greek Philosophy, and the American Catholic Philosophical Association (which also awarded him its Aquinas Medal).

Bibliography

Books (authored and edited)

  461 pages.
  535 pages.
  539 pages.
  97 pages.
  434 pages.
  384 pages.
  384 pages.  (paper).
  158 pages.
  153 pages.
  153 pages.  (paper).
  117 pages.  (cloth),  (paper).
  332 pages. .
  373 pages. .

Collected papers
  291 pages. .
  264 pages.  (cloth),  (paper).
  500 pages.  (cloth).
  256 pages.  (cloth).

Secondary sources
  447 pages. .

See also
 John F. X. Knasas

External links
Obituary of Joseph Owens at thomistica.net
A database of scholarship on Aristotle dedicated to Joseph Owens: 

1908 births
2005 deaths
20th-century American philosophers
Fellows of the Royal Society of Canada
Philosophy academics
Scholars of ancient Greek philosophy
Canadian philosophers
Catholic philosophers
Presidents of the Metaphysical Society of America
University of Toronto alumni
Canadian people of Welsh descent
Redemptorists
Presidents of the Canadian Philosophical Association